State Route 93 (SR 93) is a north–south highway that stretches from Ironton on the Oakley C. Collins Memorial Bridge to State Route 261 in Akron. The route from Ironton to West Lafayette was once signed as State Route 75. In 1962, to eliminate confusion with an interstate in Ohio having the same number, State Route 75 was replaced by State Route 93 which had previously terminated in West Lafayette.

Route description

Since 2017, the southern terminus of SR 93 has been at the Kentucky state line on the Oakley C. Collins Memorial Bridge over the Ohio River. It travels through downtown Ironton on South Second Street and Park Avenue unsigned. After exiting the city limits, it comes to at an interchange with U.S. Route 52 (US 52), the route's former terminus. , this interchange is signed as the beginning of SR 93. The route goes through Wayne National Forest and Lake Vesuvius. After leaving Wayne National Forest, the route enters Jackson County and the town of Oak Hill where it intersects with SR 140 and SR 279.  The route passes through less hilly areas as it once did in Lawrence County.  The route passes through Jackson, and in the village of Coalton, State Route 93 makes a sharp turn eastward to Wellston, where it overlaps SR 327.  After Wellston, SR 93 returns on its northerly route to Hamden, McArthur, Logan, New Lexington, Crooksville, and Zanesville.  Between Zanesville and Ironton, SR 93 is a busy truck route and used by many travelers as well.  Leaving Zanesville, the route is less traveled heading north to Canal Fulton, whence it gradually becomes more and more traveled as it approaches the Portage Lakes region.  From this point to its northern terminus, it is a road in which traffic jams are expected during rush hour.

Major junctions

References

External links

093
Transportation in Lawrence County, Ohio
Transportation in Jackson County, Ohio
Transportation in Vinton County, Ohio
Transportation in Hocking County, Ohio
Transportation in Perry County, Ohio
Transportation in Muskingum County, Ohio
Transportation in Coshocton County, Ohio
Transportation in Tuscarawas County, Ohio
Transportation in Holmes County, Ohio
Transportation in Stark County, Ohio
Transportation in Summit County, Ohio